Ángel Marín is a paralympic athlete from Spain competing mainly in category TS4 distance events.

Marín competed in three events at the 1988 Summer Paralympics: the men's 800m, 1500m, and 5000m, winning gold in all three events and setting new world records in the 1500m and 5000m.  Unfortunately at the 1992 Summer Paralympics in his home country, he did not do as well. He finished sixth in the 800m, fifth in the 1500m, and third in the 5000m, he also won a silver in the 10,000m. All four of these races were won by compatriot Javier Conde, who broke the world record in the 1500m, 5000m, and 10,000m.

References

External links
 

Paralympic athletes of Spain
Athletes (track and field) at the 1988 Summer Paralympics
Athletes (track and field) at the 1992 Summer Paralympics
Paralympic gold medalists for Spain
Paralympic silver medalists for Spain
Paralympic bronze medalists for Spain
Living people
Medalists at the 1988 Summer Paralympics
Medalists at the 1992 Summer Paralympics
Year of birth missing (living people)
Paralympic medalists in athletics (track and field)
Spanish male middle-distance runners
Spanish male long-distance runners
Middle-distance runners with limb difference
Long-distance runners with limb difference
Paralympic middle-distance runners
Paralympic long-distance runners